Return of the Silver Tongue (Traditional Chinese: 舌劍上的公堂; literally "Courtroom Tongue Sword") is a 2013 till 2014 Hong Kong drama series produced by TVB, starring Roger Kwok and Kristal Tin as the main leads, with Priscilla Wong, Evergreen Mak, Jerry Lamb, Henry Lee, KK Cheung Kwok Keung and Fred Cheng in main supporting roles. The series is produced by Lee Yim Fong. Filming began in February 2013 and finished in late May 2013. The costume fitting was held on February 21. The drama is based during the Qing Dynasty, and loosely based on a short story in the classical Chinese novel Little Bean Shed (小豆棚), by Qing Dynasty female novelist, Zeng Yandong 曾衍東.

Synopsis
Scholar Cheung Sei Wai (Roger Kwok), opens a school to cultivate new educated talents. He is good friends with his student Chow Kuk (Priscilla Wong) who, though brilliant in her own right, is not very good in school. Sei Wai is righteous and genuinely believes that education can purify one's mind and heart.

He meets the ambitious and articulate Chan Jan Jan (Kristal Tin), a female lawyer, and quickly befriends her. As Sei Wai also has an interest in the legal business, he and Jan Jan become close working partners. The villainous Poon King Chuen (Cheung Kwok Keung) and his son Poon Yi Ming (Jerry Lamb) consider Sei Wai and Jan Jan their enemies, and often caused mischief for the pair.

Sei Wai's good friend, the court guard Ha Hau Mo (Evergreen Mak), dislikes lawyers and Jan Jan, as her father Chan Mung Kat (Li Shing Cheong) framed his father, who ultimately received capital punishment. Believing that Jan Jan is more than what meets the eye, he launches an investigation on her. A 20-year-old cold case is brought back to light again.

Cast
Roger Kwok as Cheung Sei Wai a teacher then a barrister, Chan Chun Chun's love interest, then becomes her husband.
Kristal Tin as Chan Chun Chun, Cheung Sei Wai's and Ha-Hau Mu's love interest. Chan Mung Kat's daughter. Later, becomes Cheung Sei Wai's wife.
Priscilla Wong as Chow Kuk
Evergreen Mak as Ha-Hau Mu, a head detective. Chan Chun Chun's love interest, but then becomes Suen Cho Cho's husband.
Jerry Lamb as Pooh Yee Ming. Partially deaf, Poon Kan Tsuen's son and Ah To's husband.
Henry Lee as Chan Mung Kat, Chan Chun Chun's father. Pooh Kan Tsuen's enemy. 
KK Cheung as Pooh Kan Tsuen (Villain), a famous barrister and Poon Yee Ming's father. Chan Mung Kat's enemy. Later, executed in the final episode. 
Fred Cheng as Choi To Wah
Whitney Hui as Ah To, a maid in the Poon family and mute. Poon Yee Ming's wife.
Grace Wong as Suen Cho Cho and Ha-Hau Mu's wife.
Rachel Kan as Chow Lan
Yu Yeung as Kau Ching Ko
Yu Chi-ming as Lo Piu
Suet Nei as Pau Heung
Akina Hong as Koon Hei Fung, local songstress.
Jonathan Cheung as Fan Kang

Ratings

Development
Roger Kwok reportedly turned down the role of "Yinzhen, the Fourth Imperial Prince (四皇爺胤禛)" in Gilded Chopsticks and the chance to reunite with his Inbound Troubles co-stars to take on the lead in Return of the Silver Tongue.

International broadcast
  - 8TV (Malaysia)

References

External links
Official website

TVB dramas
2013 Hong Kong television series debuts
2014 Hong Kong television series endings
Hong Kong television series
Period television series
Television series set in the Qing dynasty
2010s Hong Kong television series